Giorgio Parisi  (born 4 August 1948) is an Italian theoretical physicist, whose research has focused on quantum field theory, statistical mechanics and complex systems. His best known contributions are the QCD evolution equations for parton densities, obtained with Guido Altarelli, known as the Altarelli–Parisi or DGLAP equations, the exact solution of the Sherrington–Kirkpatrick model of spin glasses, the Kardar–Parisi–Zhang equation describing dynamic scaling of growing interfaces, and the study of whirling flocks of birds. He was awarded the 2021 Nobel Prize in Physics jointly with Klaus Hasselmann and Syukuro Manabe for groundbreaking contributions to theory of complex systems, in particular "for the discovery of the interplay of disorder and fluctuations in physical systems from atomic to planetary scales."

Career
Giorgio Parisi received his degree from the University of Rome La Sapienza in 1970 under the supervision of Nicola Cabibbo. He was a researcher at the Laboratori Nazionali di Frascati (1971–1981) and a visiting scientist at the Columbia University (1973–1974), Institut des Hautes Études Scientifiques (1976–1977), and École Normale Supérieure (1977–1978). From 1981 until 1992 he was a full professor of Theoretical Physics at the University of Rome Tor Vergata and he is now professor of Quantum Theories at the Sapienza University of Rome. He is a member of the Simons Collaboration "Cracking the Glass Problem". 
From 2018 until 2021 he was the president of the Accademia dei Lincei.

Research

Parisi's research interests are broad and cover statistical physics, field theory, dynamical systems, mathematical physics and condensed matter physics, where he is particularly known for his work on spin glasses and related statistical mechanics models originating in optimization theory and biology. In particular, he made significant contributions in terms of systematic applications of the replica method to disordered systems, even though the replica method itself was originally discovered in 1971 by Sir Sam Edwards.

He has also contributed to the field of elementary particle physics, in particular to quantum chromodynamics and string theory. Together with Guido Altarelli, he introduced the so-called Dokshitzer–Gribov–Lipatov–Altarelli–Parisi equations. In the field of fluid dynamics he is known for having introduced, together with Uriel Frisch, multifractal models to describe the phenomenon of intermittency in turbulent flows. He is also known for the Kardar–Parisi–Zhang equation modelling stochastic aggregation. From the point of view of complex systems, he worked on the collective motion of animals (such as swarms and flocks). He also introduced, together with other Italian physicists, the concept of stochastic resonance in the study of climate change.

Honors and awards

Giorgio Parisi is a foreign member of the French Academy of Sciences, the American Philosophical Society, and the United States National Academy of Sciences.
Feltrinelli Prize, 1986.
Boltzmann Medal, 1992. 
"The Boltzmann Medal for 1992 is awarded to Giorgio Parisi for his fundamental contributions to statistical physics, and particularly for his solution of the mean field theory of spin glasses."

Dirac Medal of the ICTP, 1999.
"Giorgio Parisi is distinguished for his original and deep contributions to many areas of physics ranging from the study of scaling violations in deep inelastic processes (Altarelli–Parisi equations), the proposal of the superconductor's flux confinement model as a mechanism for quark confinement, the use of supersymmetry in statistical classical systems, the introduction of multifractals in turbulence, the stochastic differential equation for growth models for random aggregation (the Kardar–Parisi–Zhang equation) and his groundbreaking analysis of the replica method that has permitted an important breakthrough in our understanding of glassy systems and has proved to be instrumental in the whole subject of Disordered Systems."

Enrico Fermi Prize, 2002.
"For his contributions to field theory and statistical mechanics, and in particular for his fundamental results concerning the statistical properties of disordered systems."

Dannie Heineman Prize for Mathematical Physics, 2005. 
"For fundamental theoretical discoveries in broad areas of elementary particle physics, quantum field theory, and statistical mechanics; especially for work on spin glasses and disordered systems."

Nonino Prize “An Italian Master of our Time”, 2005.
"World-famous theoretic physicist, Giorgio Parisi is an investigator of the unpredictable, this means of all that happens in the real world and of its probable laws. A pioneer of complexity, his research of rules and balances inside chaotic systems hypothesizing mathematical instruments, may take to great discoveries in all the fields of human knowledge, from immunology to cosmology. His is a research of the next “Ariadne’s thread” of the labyrinth of our existence."

Microsoft Award, 2007.
"He has made outstanding contributions to elementary particle physics, quantum field theory and statistical mechanics, in particular to the theory of phase transitions and replica symmetry breaking for spin glasses. His approach of using computers to corroborate the conclusions of analytical proofs and to actively motivate further research has been of fundamental importance in his field."

Lagrange Prize, 2009. Awarded to scientists who have contributed most to the development of the science of complexity in various areas of knowledge.

Max Planck Medal, 2011. 
“For his significant contributions in theoretical elementary particle physics and quantum field theory and statistical physics, especially of systems with frozen disorder, especially spin glasses."

Nature Awards for Mentoring in Science – Italy, 2013 Lifetime achievement award. The Prize is awarded annually to a different country by the scientific journal "Nature".

High Energy and Particle Physics Prize  – EPS HEPP Prize, 2015.
“For developing a probabilistic field theory framework for the dynamics of quarks and gluons, enabling a quantitative understanding of high-energy collisions involving hadrons”.

Lars Onsager Prize, 2016.
“For groundbreaking work applying spin glass ideas to ensembles of computational problems, yielding both new classes of efficient algorithms and new perspectives on phase transitions in their structure and complexity”.

Pomeranchuk Prize, 2018.
“For outstanding results in quantum field theory, statistical mechanics and particle theory”.

 Honorary Doctorate in Science, the University of Extremadura (2019).

Wolf Prize, 2021.
“For ground-breaking discoveries in disordered systems, particle physics and statistical physics. The Wolf Prize in Physics is awarded to Giorgio Parisi for being one of the most creative and influential theoretical physicists in recent decades. His work has a large impact on diverse branches of physical sciences, spanning the areas of particle physics, critical phenomena, disordered systems as well as optimization theory and mathematical physics.”.

Inserted in Clarivate Citation Laureates, 2021.
"For ground-breaking discoveries in quantum-chromodynamics and in the study of complex disordered systems.".

Nobel Prize in Physics, 2021.
“For the discovery of the interplay of disorder and fluctuations in physical systems from atomic to planetary scales.”.

 Cavaliere di Gran Croce OMRI, 2021

Activism
Since 2016, Giorgio Parisi has been leading the movement "Salviamo la Ricerca Italiana" to put pressure on the Italian and European governments to start funding basic research above the subsistence level.

Selected publications

See also
Asymptotic safety in quantum gravity
Cavity method
Euclidean random matrix
Parisi–Sourlas stochastic quantization procedure
p-adic quantum mechanics
Renormalon
Self-consistency principle in high energy physics
Stochastic quantization

References

External links
Giorgio Parisi home page
Giorgio Parisi google scholar page

1948 births
20th-century Italian physicists
21st-century Italian physicists
Columbia University faculty
Foreign associates of the National Academy of Sciences
Italian Nobel laureates
Living people
Mathematical physicists
Members of the French Academy of Sciences
Nobel laureates in Physics
Sapienza University of Rome alumni
Academic staff of the Sapienza University of Rome
Scientists from Rome
Theoretical physicists
Academic staff of the University of Rome Tor Vergata
Winners of the Max Planck Medal
Members of the American Philosophical Society
Knights Grand Cross of the Order of Merit of the Italian Republic
Statistical physicists